Cerastium alpinum, commonly called alpine mouse-ear or alpine chickweed, is a mat-forming perennial plant. The species was first described by Carl Linnaeus in  1753. It is native to Greenland, Canada and northern Europe. It is grown as a rock garden subject for its many small white flowers and silver haired stems and foliage. There are three subspecies.

References

alpinum
Plants described in 1753
Taxa named by Carl Linnaeus